Collette Lyons (October 3, 1908 – October 5, 1986) was an American stage, film and television actress.

Lyons married George Randolph Hearst on March 6, 1952, in Hollywood, California. The wedding was their second such ceremony, following an October 1951 nuptial in Mexico. Lyons obtained a divorce from Hearst in Santa Monica, California, in 1958.

On December 26, 1942, Lyons married Alan Dinehart Jr. in Brooklyn, but that union was annulled in April 1950.

Filmography

Television

References

Bibliography
 Marshall, Wendy L. William Beaudine: From Silents to Television. Scarecrow Press, 2005.

External links

1908 births
1986 deaths
American film actresses
American stage actresses
American television actresses
People from Boston
20th-century American actresses